Edward Traylor "Buddy" Chandler Sr. (August 1, 1925 – June 5, 1999) was an American football coach at Bridgewater College in Bridgewater, Virginia. Chandler led the Eagles to a record of 2–4 in 1952.

Head coaching record

References

External links
 

1925 births
1999 deaths
Bridgewater Eagles football coaches
Sportspeople from Norfolk, Virginia